Yalding railway station is on the Medway Valley Line in Kent, England, serving the village of Yalding. The station and all trains that call are operated by Southeastern.

History
The line was originally single track but was doubled in 1846. In 1897 there were two platforms joined by a footbridge, a signal box and sidings both sides of the running lines. The goods yard was able to accommodate most types of goods including live stock and was equipped with a 1¼ ton crane. A camping coach was positioned here by the Southern Region from 1962 to 1967, from 1963 onwards it was a Pullman camping coach.

Facilities
Yalding station is unstaffed. The station is fitted with a self-service ticket machine as well as modern help points on the platforms. Seated areas are available on both platforms and train information screens are provided for running information. The station has a small free car park located outside the station as well as a small cycle storage area. There is a level crossing on the road outside the ststion.

The station used to have an APTIS-equipped ticket office (on the southbound platform) but this closed in 1989 and the building was then used for commercial purposes but has recently become disused.

No regular buses stop outside the station although Arriva Southern Counties routes 6 & 6X to Maidstone and Tunbridge Wells (including both Tunbridge Wells Hospital and Maidstone Hospital) stop a short walk away on Maidstone Road in Nettlestead Green.

Services
All services at Yalding are operated by Southeastern using  EMUs.

The typical off-peak service in trains per hour is:
 2 tph to  via 
 2 tph to  

On Sundays, the service is reduced to hourly in each direction.

References

External links

Borough of Maidstone
DfT Category F1 stations
Railway stations in Kent
Former South Eastern Railway (UK) stations
Railway stations in Great Britain opened in 1844
Railway stations served by Southeastern